Lattanzio Querena (1 November 1768, in Predella in Valle di Scalva – 10 July 1853) was an Italian painter, depicting historical and sacred subjects, in a mainly Neoclassical style.

Biography
He was born in the province of Bergamo. He studied at the Academy of Fine Arts of Verona, and also studied in Venice under Francesco Maggiotto. He later worked under Francesco Fedeli.

He was very skillful in restoring old masters, and painted altarpieces for many churches in Venice, including a Santa Marina for Santa Maria Formosa; a Repose in Egypt for Santa Maria del Pianto; a St Francis of Assisi and a Sacred Heart for church of Nome di Gesù, Venice; a Deposition for the Santi Giovanni e Paolo; and the ancient mosaic depicting the Final Judgement located at the  St. Mark's Basilica. He was the father of painter Luigi Querena. One of his daughters married the genre painter Antonio Rotta (1828–1903). Lattanzio died in Venice.

References

1760 births
1863 deaths
18th-century Italian painters
Italian male painters
19th-century Italian painters
Painters from Bergamo
People from Clusone
Accademia di Belle Arti di Venezia alumni
19th-century Italian male artists
18th-century Italian male artists